Robert Honyman or Honeyman may refer to:

 Robert Honyman (Royal Navy officer) (1765–1848), Royal Navy Admiral, Member of Parliament (MP) for Orkney and Shetland 1796–1806
 Robert Honyman (British Army officer) (1781–1808), lieutenant colonel in the Army, MP for Orkney and Shetland 1806–1807

See also
Honyman
Honyman baronets